Kleinhoff Hotel is a 1977 erotic drama film directed by Carlo Lizzani.

Plot 
Pascale is a rich and beautiful French lady married to an architect, both often traveling around the world for work and then far away from each other.
Just one of these circumstances, Pascale loses her plane to London and is forced to stay in Berlin. She chooses to stay at Kleinhoff Hotel, where she had lived as a student years earlier.
The room next to her is occupied by Alex, a young fugitive terrorist hunted by German police and instructed by his group to eliminate Pedro, a suspected traitor.

The curiosity and attraction to Alex becomes so overwhelming that Pascale renounces to her departure for London in order to stalk the young terrorist.

Cast 

Corinne Cléry: Pascale Rostand 
Bruce Robinson: Karl aka Alex 
Katja Rupé: Petra
Werner Pochath: David 
Peter Kern: Erich Müller
Michele Placido: Pedro

Production
At the time this film came out, newspaper advertisements said it contained unsimulated sex. Corinne Cléry, the main actress, sued the distribution and production companies, complaining that the advertisement had damaged her private and professional life. On the other hand, the two companies defended themselves and brought as testimony a series of photos from the set showing "the beginning of the sexual act, complete with insertion".

References

External links

1977 films
Italian erotic drama films
1970s erotic drama films
Films directed by Carlo Lizzani
Films set in Berlin
Films set in West Germany
1977 drama films
1970s Italian films